Carlos Herrera (1856–1930) was a Guatemalan politician who was acting president between 1920 and 1921.

Carlos Herrera may also refer to:

Carlos Herrera (boxer) (born 1983), Argentine boxer
Carlos Herrera (journalist) (born 1957), Spanish journalist
Carlos Herrera (footballer, born 1997), Mexican footballer
Carlos Herrera Araluce (1936–2016), Mexican politician
Carlos Herrera Contreras (born 1983), Chilean footballer
Carlos María Herrera (1875–1914), Uruguayan painter

See also
Carl Herrera (born 1966), Venezuelan basketball player
Carlos (footballer, born 1948), Spanish footballer, full name Carlos Ruiz Herrero